In solid-state physics, the free electron model is a quantum mechanical model for the behaviour of charge carriers in a metallic solid. It was developed in 1927, principally by Arnold Sommerfeld, who combined the classical Drude model with quantum mechanical Fermi–Dirac statistics and hence it is also known as the Drude–Sommerfeld model.

Given its simplicity, it is surprisingly successful in explaining many experimental phenomena, especially
 the Wiedemann–Franz law which relates electrical conductivity and thermal conductivity;
 the temperature dependence of the electron heat capacity;
 the shape of the electronic density of states;
 the range of binding energy values;
 electrical conductivities;
 the Seebeck coefficient of the thermoelectric effect;
 thermal electron emission and field electron emission from bulk metals.

The free electron model solved many of the inconsistencies related to the Drude model and gave insight into several other properties of metals. The free electron model considers that metals are composed of a quantum electron gas where ions play almost no role. The model can be very predictive when applied to alkali and noble metals.

Ideas and assumptions

In the free electron model four main assumptions are taken into account:
Free electron approximation: The interaction between the ions and the valence electrons is mostly neglected, except in boundary conditions. The ions only keep the charge neutrality in the metal. Unlike in the Drude model, the ions are not necessarily the source of collisions.
Independent electron approximation: The interactions between electrons are ignored. The electrostatic fields in metals are weak because of the screening effect.
Relaxation-time approximation: There is some unknown scattering mechanism such that the electron probability of collision is inversely proportional to the relaxation time , which represents the average time between collisions. The collisions do not depend on the electronic configuration.
Pauli exclusion principle: Each quantum state of the system can only be occupied by a single electron. This restriction of available electron states is taken into account by Fermi–Dirac statistics (see also Fermi gas). Main predictions of the free-electron model are derived by the Sommerfeld expansion of the Fermi–Dirac occupancy for energies around the Fermi level.

The name of the model comes from the first two assumptions, as each electron can be treated as free particle with a respective quadratic relation between energy and momentum.

The crystal lattice is not explicitly taken into account in the free electron model, but a quantum-mechanical justification was given a year later (1928) by Bloch's theorem: an unbound electron moves in a periodic potential as a free electron in vacuum, except for the electron mass me becoming an effective mass m* which may deviate considerably from me (one can even use negative effective mass to describe conduction by electron holes). Effective masses can be derived from band structure computations that were not originally taken into account in the free electron model.

From the Drude model 

Many physical properties follow directly from the Drude model, as some equations do not depend on the statistical distribution of the particles. Taking the classical velocity distribution of an ideal gas or the velocity distribution of a Fermi gas only changes the results related to the speed of the electrons.

Mainly, the free electron model and the Drude model predict the same DC electrical conductivity σ for Ohm's law, that is
 with 

Other quantities that remain the same under the free electron model as under Drude's are the AC susceptibility, the plasma frequency,  the magnetoresistance, and the Hall coefficient related to the Hall effect.

Properties of an electron gas 

Many properties of the free electron model follow directly from equations related to the Fermi gas, as the independent electron approximation leads to an ensemble of non-interacting electrons. For a three-dimensional electron gas we can define the Fermi energy as

where  is the reduced Planck constant. The Fermi energy defines the energy of the highest energy electron at zero temperature. For metals the Fermi energy is in the order of units of electronvolts above the free electron band minimum energy.

Density of states 
The 3D density of states (number of energy states, per energy per volume) of a non-interacting electron gas is given by:

where  is the energy of a given electron. This formula takes into account the spin degeneracy but does not consider a possible energy shift due to the bottom of the conduction band. For 2D the density of states is constant and for 1D is inversely proportional to the square root of the electron energy.

Fermi level 
The chemical potential  of electrons in a solid is also known as the Fermi level and, like the related Fermi energy, often denoted . The Sommerfeld expansion can be used to calculate the Fermi level at higher temperatures as:

where  is the temperature and we define  as the Fermi temperature ( is Boltzmann constant). The perturbative approach is justified as the Fermi temperature is usually of about 105 K for a metal, hence at room temperature or lower the Fermi energy  and the chemical potential  are practically equivalent.

Compressibility of metals and degeneracy pressure 
The total energy per unit volume (at ) can also be calculated by integrating over the phase space of the system, we obtain

which does not depend on temperature. Compare with the energy per electron of an ideal gas: , which is null at zero temperature. For an ideal gas to have the same energy as the electron gas, the temperatures would need to be of the order of the Fermi temperature. Thermodynamically, this energy of the electron gas corresponds to a zero-temperature pressure given by
 

This pressure is called the electron degeneracy pressure and does not come from repulsion or motion of the electrons but from the restriction that no more than two electrons (due to the two values of spin) can occupy the same energy level. This pressure defines the compressibility or bulk modulus of the metal

This expression gives the right order of magnitude for the bulk modulus for alkali metals and noble metals, which show that this pressure is as important as other effects inside the metal. For other metals the crystalline structure has to be taken into account.

Magnetic response 
According to the Bohr–Van Leeuwen theorem, a classical system at thermodynamic equilibrium cannot have a magnetic response. The magnetic properties of matter in terms of a microscopic theory are purely quantum mechanical. For an electron gas, the total magnetic response is paramagnetic and its magnetic susceptibility given by 

This value results from the competition of two contributions: a diamagnetic contribution (known as Landau's diamagnetism) coming from the orbital motion of the electrons in the presence of a magnetic field, and a paramagnetic contribution (Pauli's paramagnetism). The latter contribution is three times larger in absolute value than the diamagnetic contribution and comes from the electron spin, an intrinsic quantum degree of freedom that can take two discrete values and it is associated to the electron magnetic moment.

Corrections to Drude's model

Heat capacity 

One open problem in solid-state physics before the arrival of quantum mechanics was to understand the heat capacity of metals. While most solids had a constant volumetric heat capacity given by Dulong–Petit law of about at large temperatures, it did correctly predict its behavior at low temperatures. In the case of metals that are good conductors, it was expected that the electrons contributed also the heat capacity.

The classical calculation using Drude's model, based on an ideal gas, provides a volumetric heat capacity given by
.

If this was the case, the heat capacity of a metals should be 1.5 of that obtained by the Dulong–Petit law.

Nevertheless, such a large additional contribution to the heat capacity of metals was never measured, raising suspicions about the argument above. By using Sommerfeld's expansion one can obtain corrections of the energy density at finite temperature and obtain the volumetric heat capacity of an electron gas, given by:
,

Evidently, the electronic contribution alone does not predict the Dulong–Petit law, i.e. the observation that the heat capacity of a metal is still constant at high temperatures. The free electron model can be improved in this sense by adding the contribution of the vibrations of the crystal lattice. Two famous quantum corrections include the Einstein solid model and the more refined Debye model. With the addition of the later, the volumetric heat capacity of a metal at low temperatures can be more precisely written in the form, 
, 
The linear term comes from the electronic contribution while the cubic term comes from Debye model. At high temperature this expression is no longer correct, the electronic heat capacity can be neglected, and the total heat capacity of the metal tends to a constant given by the Dulong–petit law.

Mean free path 
Notice that without the relaxation time approximation, there is no reason for the electrons to deflect their motion, as there are no interactions, thus the mean free path should be infinite. The Drude model considered the mean free path of electrons to be close to the distance between ions in the material, implying the earlier conclusion that the diffusive motion of the electrons was due to collisions with the ions. The mean free path is then not a result of electron–ion collisions but instead is related to imperfections in the material, either due to defects and impurities in the metal, or due to thermal fluctuations.

Thermal conductivity and thermopower 
While Drude's model predicts a similar value for the electric conductivity as the free electron model, the models predict slightly different thermal conductivities.

This implies that the ratio between thermal and electric conductivity is given by the Wiedemann–Franz law,

where  is the Lorenz number, given by 

The free electron model is closer to the measured value of  V2/K2 while the Drude prediction is off by about half the value, which is not a large difference. The close prediction to the Lorenz number in the Drude model was a result of the classical kinetic energy of electron being about 100 smaller than the quantum version, compensating the large value of the classical heat capacity. 

However, Drude's mode predicts the wrong order of magnitude for the Seebeck coefficient (thermopower), which relates the generation of a potential difference by applying a temperature gradient across a sample . This coefficient can be showed to be , which is just proportional to the heat capacity, so the Drude model predicts a constant that is hundred times larger than the value of the free electron model. While the latter get as coefficient that is linear in temperature and provides much more accurate values in the order of a few tens of µV/K at room temperature.

Inaccuracies and extensions
The free electron model presents several inadequacies that are contradicted by experimental observation. We list some inaccuracies below:
 Temperature dependence The free electron model presents several physical quantities that have the wrong temperature dependence, or no dependence at all like the electrical conductivity. The thermal conductivity and specific heat are well predicted for alkali metals at low temperatures, but fails to predict high temperature behaviour coming from ion motion and phonon scattering.
 Hall effect and magnetoresistance The Hall coefficient has a constant value  in Drude's model and in the free electron model. This value is independent of temperature and the strength of the magnetic field. The Hall coefficient is actually dependent on the band structure and the difference with the model can be quite dramatic when studying elements like magnesium and aluminium that have a strong magnetic field dependence. The free electron model also predicts that the traverse magnetoresistance, the resistance in the direction of the current, does not depend on the strength of the field. In almost all the cases it does.
 Directional The conductivity of some metals can depend of the orientation of the sample with respect to the electric field. Sometimes even the electrical current is not parallel to the field.  This possibility is not described because the model does not integrate the crystallinity of metals, i.e. the existence of a periodic lattice of ions. 
 Diversity in the conductivity Not all materials are electrical conductors,  some do not conduct electricity very well (insulators), some can conduct when impurities are added like semiconductors. Semimetals, with narrow conduction bands also exist. This diversity is not predicted by the model and can only by explained by analysing the valence and conduction bands. Additionally, electrons are not the only charge carriers in a metal, electron vacancies or holes can be seen as quasiparticles carrying positive electric charge. Conduction of holes leads to an opposite sign for the Hall and Seebeck coefficients predicted by the model.

Other inadequacies are present in the Wiedemann–Franz law at intermediate temperatures and the frequency-dependence of metals in the optical spectrum.

More exact values for the electrical conductivity and Wiedemann–Franz law can be obtained by softening the relaxation-time approximation by appealing to the Boltzmann transport equations or the Kubo formula.

The exchange interaction is totally excluded from this model and its inclusion can lead to other magnetic responses like ferromagnetism.

An immediate continuation to the free electron model can be obtained by assuming the empty lattice approximation, which forms the basis of the band structure model known as the nearly free electron model.

Adding repulsive interactions between electrons does not change very much the picture presented here. Lev Landau showed that a Fermi gas under repulsive interactions, can be seen as a gas of equivalent quasiparticles that slightly modify the properties of the metal. Landau's model is now known as the Fermi liquid theory. More exotic phenomena like superconductivity, where interactions can be attractive, require a more refined theory.

See also
 Bloch's theorem
 Electronic entropy
 Tight binding
 Two-dimensional electron gas
 Bose–Einstein statistics
 Fermi surface
 White dwarf
 Jellium

References

General

Quantum models
Condensed matter physics
Electronic band structures
Electron
Arnold Sommerfeld